The Roman Catholic Diocese of Zomba is a diocese located in the city of Zomba in the Ecclesiastical province of Blantyre in Malawi.

History
 May 15, 1952: Established as Apostolic Vicariate of Zomba from the Apostolic Vicariate of Shiré
 April 25, 1959: Promoted as Diocese of Zomba

Leadership
 Vicar Apostolic of Zomba (Roman rite)
 Bishop Lawrence Pullen Hardman, S.M.M. (1952.05.15 – 1959.04.25 see below)
 Bishops of Zomba (Roman rite)
 Bishop Lawrence Pullen Hardman, S.M.M. (see above 1959.04.25 – 1970.09.21)
 Bishop Matthias A. Chimole (1970.09.21 – 1979.12.20), appointed Bishop of Lilongwe
 Bishop Allan Chamgwera (1981.02.12 – 2004.01.17)
 Bishop Thomas Luke Msusa, S.M.M. (2003.12.19 – 2013.11.21), appointed Archbishop of Blantyre
 Bishop George Desmond Tambala, O.C.D. (2015.10.15 – 2021.10.15), appointed Archbishop of Lilongwe

See also
Roman Catholicism in Malawi

Sources
 Giga-Catholic Information
 Catholic Hierarchy

Roman Catholic dioceses in Malawi
Christian organizations established in 1969
Roman Catholic dioceses and prelatures established in the 20th century
Roman Catholic Ecclesiastical Province of Blantyre